Fang Dan (born March 20, 1985 in Qiqihar, China) is a Chinese figure skater. She is a three-time Chinese national champion, three time silver medalist, and two time bronze medalist.

Competitive highlights

External links

 

Chinese female single skaters
Figure skaters at the 2007 Winter Universiade
1985 births
Living people
Sportspeople from Qiqihar
Medalists at the 2007 Winter Universiade
Figure skaters at the 2003 Asian Winter Games
Figure skaters at the 2007 Asian Winter Games
Universiade medalists in figure skating
Universiade bronze medalists for China
Figure skaters from Heilongjiang
Competitors at the 2005 Winter Universiade